Alberto Maffei (born 11 May 1995) is an Italian snowboarder.
 
He competed in the 2017 FIS Snowboard World Championships, and in the 2018 Winter Olympics, in big air.

References

External links

1995 births
Living people
Italian male snowboarders
Olympic snowboarders of Italy
Snowboarders at the 2018 Winter Olympics
Sportspeople from Trentino
21st-century Italian people